The Youth of the Devil (Italian: La giovinezza del diavolo) is a 1921 Italian silent film directed by Roberto Roberti and starring Francesca Bertini.

The film's sets were designed by the art director Alfredo Manzi.

Cast
Francesca Bertini as the old Duchess / Fausta
Gino Viotti as the old Marquis
Ignazio Bracci
Maud de Mosley
Lydianne as adventurer  
Ettore Piergiovanni as the young nephew of the Marquis
Raimondo Van Riel as Devil    
Achille Vitti as the Quaestor

References

External links

Films directed by Roberto Roberti
Italian silent feature films
Italian black-and-white films
1920s Italian-language films